Ghullah Wattwan is a town located to the east of Feroze Wattwan in Sheikhupura District, Pakistan. The town has a population of 10,000, mostly farmers and constructors.malik bashir ahmed wattoo(kaloka) is famous personality of ghullah wattwan.

History 
Watto is rajpoot cast, Since 1998 watto has converted with 2 section behind the fight for lands, Some Watto's are moved in other place and they were make the different place with different name, their name chosen is Ghullah Wattwan.

People 
Mostly people who living here they are farmers, shopskippers, govt servant and constructor's. Ghullah Wattwan Tribes are Wattoo Rajpoot, Rana Rajpoot,  Arain, Bhatti, and Rai / Kharal. People of town still love him due to their polite behaviour and geniality.
Malik Bahawal Wattoo Zaildar

Administration 
Ghullah Wattwan is administrated in Fereoze Wattwan union council which is sub-city of Sheikhupura's Tehsil Administration.

References 

Populated places in Sheikhupura District